Episemion krystallinoron is a species of African rivuline native to Equatorial Guinea and Gabon.

References
 

Nothobranchiidae

Fish of Equatorial Guinea
Fish of Gabon
Fish described in 2006